Pero Alvarez was a man who came to England from Portugal, and had been enslaved. Henry VII of England formally declared him free of his slavery, which was not then a recognised state in England. This was a legal proof that was later used as a precedent and was accepted in 1490 by Joao II of Portugal.

References

15th-century births
Year of death missing
People of the Tudor period
15th-century English people
15th-century Portuguese people
15th-century slaves
Slavery in the United Kingdom
Portuguese slaves
Freedmen